The 1970 NAIA World Series was the 14th annual tournament hosted by the National Association of Intercollegiate Athletics to determine the national champion of baseball among its member colleges and universities in the United States and Canada.

The tournament was played at Phoenix Municipal Stadium in Phoenix, Arizona.

Eastern Michigan (41-11) defeated Northeast Louisiana (35-19) in the second game of the championship series, 1–0, to win the Hurons' first NAIA World Series.

Eastern Michigan third baseman Jeff Peck was named tournament MVP.

Bracket

See also
 1970 NCAA University Division baseball tournament
 1970 NCAA College Division baseball tournament

Reference

NAIA World Series
NAIA World Series
NAIA World Series